The Estadio Universitario is a multi-use stadium in Caracas, Venezuela, and is used mostly for baseball games. The stadium holds 20,723 people and was built in 1952.

The Estadio Universitario serves as the home stadium for the Venezuelan Professional Baseball League club the Leones del Caracas and until 2019, the Tiburones de la Guaira as well.

Conciertos

References

Baseball venues in Venezuela
Estadio Universitario de Caracas
Sports venues completed in 1952
Estadio Universitario de Caracas
Sports venues in Caracas